Sea Police is a South Korean reality show broadcast on MBC every1, where celebrities join the Korean Coast Guard to experience their work protecting coastal waters and communities. The show is the first spin-off of Rural Police, which features a similar premise focused on police centres in the countryside. Like the original series, the cast act in the capacity of an entry-level police officer alongside mentor police officers in their assigned Coast Guard substation.

Season 1 aired on Mondays at 20:30 (KST) from August 13 to September 10, 2018. It was filmed in Seo-gu, Busan, South Gyeongsang-do with an all-new cast separate from Rural Police.

Season 2 aired on Wednesdays at 22:20 (KST) from November 25 to December 30, 2020, with Jo Jae-yoon returning to the cast alongside Lee Tae-hwan from the second spin-off Urban Cops and two new members. It was filmed at Nohwa Island (Nohwado) in Wando-gun, South Jeolla-do.

Cast

Main cast

Coast Guard officers

List of episodes

Season 1

Season 2

References

External links 

 Season 1 website (in Korean)
 Season 2 website (in Korean)

South Korean reality television series
Korean-language television shows
2018 South Korean television series debuts
MBC TV original programming